"Afraid of Heights" is the first single by Billy Talent from their fifth studio album of the same name. It was released on May 12, 2016. The song was released first for radio play on 102.1 The Edge, followed by an exclusive stream through Alternative Press, followed by a wide release on YouTube, iTunes, Spotify and other digital retailers, a day later, on May 13, at midnight.

An official lyric video for the song was released through the band's official YouTube channel on June 15, 2016. The lyric video was designed and animated by Peter J. Arvidsson.

The band debuted the song live on May 29, 2016, during their performance at the Anabuk Festival in Moscow, Russia, the band's first tour date of 2016. During the same performance, the band debuted two other new songs: "Louder Than the DJ" and "Big Red Gun", which were not officially released at that point.

Chart performance
In 2016, "Afraid of Heights" peaked at #1 on the Billboard Canada Rock chart.

References

External links

Billy Talent songs
2016 songs